During the 1999–2000 English football season, Walsall F.C. competed in the Football League First Division.

Season summary
In the 1999–2000 season, Walsall were relegated on the final day despite derby wins over local rivals Wolverhampton Wanderers, Birmingham City and West Bromwich Albion earlier in the campaign.

Final league table

Results
Walsall's score comes first

Legend

Football League First Division

FA Cup

League Cup

Squad

Left club during season

References

 Walsall squad for 1999–2000 season

Walsall F.C. seasons
Walsall F.C.